Maurice Alter (born ) is an Australian billionaire property developer.

Biography
Maurice Alter was born to a Polish Jewish family in Poland. He emigrated to Australia after the Second World War.

Alter started his Pacific Group property development business in 1979, and it is active mostly in Victoria and South Australia, including the Werribee Plaza and Pacific Epping in Melbourne.

Personal life 
Alter is married to Helen Alter and they have two children; and live in Melbourne, Victoria.

Net worth 
Alter is one of ten individuals listed on every Financial Review Rich List since the first list was published in 1984.

References

1920s births
Living people
Australian billionaires
Australian company founders
People from Melbourne
Polish emigrants to Australia
20th-century Polish Jews